The 1966 Tampa Spartans football team represented the University of Tampa in the 1966 NCAA College Division football season. It was the Spartans' 30th season. The team was led by head coach Sam Bailey, in his third year, and played their home games at Phillips Field in Tampa, Florida. They finished with a record of four wins and five losses (4–5).

Schedule

References

Tampa
Tampa Spartans football seasons
Tampa Spartans football